Reuben Christopher Langdon (born July 19, 1975) is an American stuntman and voice actor. He has provided the voice and motion capture for video game characters including Dante in the Devil May Cry series (starting from Devil May Cry 3: Dante's Awakening), Ken Masters in the Street Fighter series (since Street Fighter IV) and Super Smash Bros. Ultimate.

Early life
Reuben Christopher Langdon was born in Alaska on July 19, 1975, and grew up in Georgia.

Career
Langdon began acting in Japan in B-Fighter Kabuto. Some action scenes from the show were reused in the US show Beetleborgs Metallix. Langdon moved to Hong Kong, where he continued to work on films.

He had a cameo role in Power Rangers Time Force in 2001 and performed a number of stunts in Power Rangers: Lost Galaxy and Power Rangers: Lightspeed Rescue. Langdon has done stunts for television including CSI: Miami and Dexter. Besides these, he has done stunts in movies such as The Medallion, Spider-Man 2, Pirates of the Caribbean: At World's End, Night at the Museum 2, Ant-Man, Scott Pilgrim vs. the World and Avatar.

Langdon's sound performances are done mainly in Capcom video games. He first voiced Dante in Devil May Cry 3 and reprised the role in Devil May Cry 4, Devil May Cry 5 and Marvel vs. Capcom series (since Marvel vs. Capcom 3). Langdon dubbed characters in the English Devil May Cry anime series. In addition, he voiced Ken Masters, the narrator of Street Fighter IV and Street Fighter IV: The Ties That Bind.

For Devil May Cry 3, Devil May Cry 4 and Devil May Cry 5, Langdon also did the motion capture for certain scenes. During the development of Devil May Cry 3, Langdon found that doing the motion capture of Dante was difficult to the multiple moves the character makes. Langdon often discussed with the staff about Dante's characterization that was different from the original one as they wanted "a different spin." Eventually, Langdon decided to do his own rendition of Dante as he was confused with the staff's suggestions. In retrospective, Langdon finds Dante "the most difficult, frustrating and yet rewarding character" he has ever played and stated he grew attached with him. Langdon was told to make Devil May Cry 4's Dante similar to his Devil May Cry 3 persona albeit more mature. Despite the staff's concerns for the difficulties of such portrayal, Langdon had no issues after choosing Roy Focker from the anime series The Super Dimension Fortress Macross as his character model and noting he had almost the same age as Dante during production of the game. Langdon's performance as Dante in Devil May Cry 3 and Devil May Cry 4 received praise by GamesRadar for being the character's best voice actor noting that the two previous actors did not fit the character well.

Langdon has also done stunt work for the Uncharted series and The Last of Us (including stunt-work for its companion game Left Behind) where he played the character James, both games working opposite Nolan North. Through his work with the motion capture studio Just Cause Productions, he has been a part of the motion-capture process for many games developed around the world, such as the remakes of Resident Evil 2 and Resident Evil 3.

Langdon also stars in Shuta Sueyoshi and ISSA song music video called Over "Quartzer", which also serves as Kamen Rider Zi-O opening theme song.

While filming a documentary in Guatemala in February 2019, the car Langdon and Steve Copeland were in was shot at. The gunman then tried to break into the vehicle and opened fire again as the pair sped away.

Recognition
GamesRadar called Reuben Langdon Dante's best voice actor (in Devil May Cry 3 and 4), noting that the two other actors did not fit the character well. Anime News Network agreed, saying that it made the character far more likable in the anime series despite flaws in its writing. IGN concurred, finding Langdon a better actor than Toshiyuki Morikawa due to his experience with the series.

Personal life
Langdon claims to have had his first UFO sighting in the late 2000s, which sparked his interest in ufology and the paranormal. He has since spent time researching extraterrestrials, and is the creator and host of the web show Interview With E.D. (Extra-Dimensionals). In 2013, he co-produced a five-day event called the Citizen Hearing on Disclosure at the National Press Club in Washington, D.C. The event brought together over 40 people, mostly ex-government and military, to testify in front of six former U.S. Congress members in a mock congressional hearing about the possibility of aliens interacting with humans. He has claimed that this event is the most comprehensive body of evidence and testimony delivered to the public on the subject of aliens.

Filmography

Stunts

Acting

Animation

Video games

References

External links
 
 

1975 births
Living people
Place of birth missing (living people)
American male video game actors
American male voice actors
American stunt performers
21st-century American male actors
American shooting survivors
Male motion capture actors